The sooty flycatcher (Muscicapa infuscata) is a species of bird in the family Muscicapidae.  It is found in Angola, Cameroon, Central African Republic, Republic of the Congo, Democratic Republic of the Congo, Equatorial Guinea, Gabon, Nigeria, South Sudan, Tanzania, Uganda, and Zambia.  Its natural habitat is subtropical or tropical moist lowland forests.

References

sooty flycatcher
Birds of Central Africa
sooty flycatcher
Taxonomy articles created by Polbot
Taxobox binomials not recognized by IUCN